Sekolah Menengah Kebangsaan Taman Daya or TDS (Taman Daya School) is a secondary school located in Jalan Rumbia 39, Taman Daya, Johor Bahru, Johor, Malaysia.

See also
 Education in Malaysia

1995 establishments in Malaysia
Buildings and structures in Johor Bahru
Educational institutions established in 1995
Secondary schools in Malaysia
Schools in Johor